Rubus rosa is a North American species of highbush blackberry in section Alleghenienses of the genus Rubus, a member of the rose family. It grows in eastern Canada (Québec) and the eastern and central United States (from Maine south to North Carolina and west as far as Nebraska).

References

External links
 Herbarium specimen at Missouri Botanical Garden, collected in Missouri in 1917
 

rosa
Plants described in 1944
Flora of Quebec
Flora of the United States
Flora without expected TNC conservation status